Carola Zwick (born 1966 in Konstanz) is a German product designer and professor of design, at the Kunsthochschule Berlin-Weissensee. She specializes in  patterns of interaction (both physical and virtual) as well as work tools and environments that are collaborative.

Life 
Carola Zwick completed her studies in Industrial Design at Humboldt University (now the University of the Arts (HDK) Berlin) in 1991, where she studied with Hans Roericht. From 1993 to 1998, she was a research associate at the HdK Berlin and built up the group "ID5" with Industrial Designer and UdK-Professor Burkhard Schmitz.

From 1998 to 2008, she was Professor for Interaction Design at Magdeburg-Stendal University of Applied Sciences. Zwick is co-founder and shareholder of the internationally active design studio 7.5., which has been based in Berlin since 1992. In addition to product developments around the subject of work, the studio explores new materials and processes as well as the potential of digital distribution processes to develop sustainable product and usage concepts, including a chair with a "sophisticated ergonomic design that responds to your body in real time."

In 2008, she was appointed professor for design, specifically product design, at the Weißensee Kunsthochschule Berlin. There, in 2010, she co-founded with designer and artist Zane Berzina and digital media designer Barbara Junge the eLAB laboratory for interactive technologies, an experimental, cross-disciplinary research platform to explore the creative discourse on the role and potential of information technologies.

Since 2011, she has been Principal Investigator in the Cluster of Excellence Interdisciplinary Laboratory Image Knowledge Design at the Hermann von Helmholtz Center for Cultural Engineering at the Humboldt University Berlin. She is also co-founder of DesignFarmBerlin, a Design-in-Tech Accelerator, which since 2016 has helped young designers by providing scholarships and mentoring programs to help them develop sustainable recovery strategies for their innovations.

Selected publications 

 Co-Autorin: Navigation for the Internet and Other Digital Media
 Digital Color for the Internet and Other Media
 Designing for Small Screens
 Publisher: The digital turn. 1st Edition Verlag, Zurich 2012, ISBN 978-3-906027-02-9 .

References

External links 
 Studio 7.5
 eLAB
 Interdisziplinäres Labor Bild Wissen Gestaltung
 DesignFarmBerlin

German designers
1966 births
Living people
People from Konstanz
Berlin University of the Arts alumni
German academics
20th-century German women artists
20th-century German women
Product designers